Daudpur is a village in Harchandpur block of Rae Bareli district, Uttar Pradesh, India. It is located 5 km from Raebareli, the district headquarters. As of 2011, its population is 1,175, in 220 households.

The 1961 census recorded Daudpur as comprising 1 hamlet, with a total population of 450 people (229 male and 221 female), in 113 households and 95 physical houses. The area of the village was given as 343 acres and it had a medical practitioner at that point.

The 1981 census recorded Daudpur as having a population of 701 people, in 135 households, and having an area of 138.00 hectares. The main staple foods were given as wheat and rice.

References

Villages in Raebareli district